G.-Oscar-Villeneuve Ecological Reserve is an ecological reserve of Quebec, Canada. It was established on June 21, 1989  and is located near Saint-Fulgence and Sainte-Rose-du-Nord, north of the Saguenay River, to the northeast of the La Baie section of Saguenay.

References

External links
 Official website from Government of Québec

Nature reserves in Quebec
Protected areas established in 1989
Protected areas of Saguenay–Lac-Saint-Jean
1989 establishments in Quebec